Dianthus caespitosus, called the Karoo pink or koperangelier, is a species of flowering plant in the family Caryophyllaceae.

It is indigenous to the south-western Cape of South Africa, where it occurs on dry rocky slopes from Worcester in the west, northwards to Botterkloof near Clanwilliam, south to Genadendal and Riversdale, and eastwards to Uitenhage.

Description
Dianthus caespitosus is a spreading or tufted herbaceous perennial reaching 40 cm high, with linear (60mm x 5mm) blue-grey leaves along the stems (leaves usually deciduous or absent below crowns). 

The inflorescence is simple (sometimes sparsely branched). It rises c. 20 cm above the main leaf tufts, with smaller (5-15mm) leaf-pairs dispersed along it. 

The flowers are pale-yellow to cream coloured, c. 25 mm wide, and appear in Spring-Summer (Sept-Jan.). 
The petals (c. 15x20mm) are always somewhat toothed or fringed. 

The calyx is elongated, 40-70 mm in length, with 3-4 bract-pairs. 
The calyx bracts are elongated acuminate, with sharp points, and only sometimes with faint, narrow papery margins.

References

caespitosus
Flora of South Africa
Renosterveld